Lysinibacillus agricola is a Gram-positive and rod-shaped bacterium from the genus of Lysinibacillus which has been isoladed from soil from Fujian.

References

Bacillaceae
Bacteria described in 2021